Aujla is a village in Phillaur in Jalandhar district of Punjab State, India. The village is administrated by Sarpanch, an elected representative of the village.

Demography 
, the village had a total number of 337 houses and a population of 1693, which included 869 males and 824 females.  According to the report published by Census India in 2011, out of the total population of the village 770 people are from Schedule Caste and the village does not have any Schedule Tribe population so far.

See also
 List of villages in India

References

External links 
 Tourism of Punjab
 Census of Punjab

Villages in Jalandhar district